The Secretary for Security is the government department responsible for public safety and security in Macau. The role replaced the former post of Secretary for Public Security. It is responsible for managing the Macau public security and police agencies.

Subordinate entities 
The following entities are controlled under the MSF:
 
 Public Security Police Force
 Immigration Department of the Macao Special Administrative Region is a sub unit under Public Security Police Force
 
 Public Security Forces Affairs Bureau
 Correctional Services Bureau
 Fire Services Bureau
 Academy for Public Security Forces

List of Secretariats

Commissioners
 José Proença Branco - Unitary Police Service
 Chôi Lai Hang - Director General of the Macau Custom Service
 Lai Man Wa - Deputy Director General of the Customs Service
 Lei Siu Peng - Public Security Police
 Ma Io Kun - Deputy Commissioner Public Security Police
 Lei Man Kim - Deputy Commissioner Public Security Police
 Wong Sio Chak - Director, Judiciary Police
 Cheong Ioc Iong - Deputy Director, Judiciary Police
 João Augusto da Rosa, Judiciary Police
 Lee Kam Cheong - Director, Macau Prison
 Loi Kam Wan - Commissioner of Macau Fire Service
 Eurico Lopes Fazenda - Deputy Commissioner Macau Fire Service
 Lei Pun Chi - Deputy Commissioner Macau Fire Service

Office of the Secretary for Security 
The Secretariat's offices are located at the former San Francisco Barracks located near to what is now S. Francisco Garden.

Chief of Office
 Vong Chun Fat

References 

 Organization Chart of the MSAR

Security, Secretariat for
Government departments and agencies of Macau
Political office-holders in Macau
Positions of the Macau Government
1999 establishments in Macau